Erman Kunter (born 8 October 1956) is a Turkish-French former professional basketball player and coach. He most recently served as head coach of Galatasaray, of the Turkish Basketball Super League (BSL).

He is well-known for being the player that scored the most points ever in a single-game of any top-tier level professional basketball league in the world, with 153 points scored in a Turkish Super League game in 1988.

Professional playing career
During his pro club career, Kunter played with İTÜ, Beşiktaş, Eczacıbaşı, Yenişehir Meysu, Fenerbahçe, and Çukurova Sanayi.

As a Fenerbahçe player, he scored 153 points (81 points in the first half), of his team's 175 total points, in a Turkish League game against Hilalspor, on 12 March, 1988. It is still a record in Turkey, and the highest single-game scoring record ever in any top-tier level professional league in the world. During the game, he made 17 three-pointers.

National team career
Kunter played in 213 games with the senior Turkish national team, and scored a total of 3,699 points (17.4 points per game). With Turkey, he played at EuroBasket 1981.

Coaching career
Kunter was the head coach of Darüşşafaka, Beşiktaş, the senior Turkish national team, and Galatasaray Istanbul in Turkey; and Cholet Basket, Asvel Villeurbanne, and Le Mans in France. In 2010, he led Cholet Basket to win the French League championship. In June 2012, he signed with Beşiktaş, to be their new head coach. 

After that, he returned to France, to be the head coach of Le Mans, in 2014. He became the head coach of Galatasaray in 2017. He was also hired to be the head coach of the senior Iraqi national basketball team, in 2017. In September 2022, he was hired as a head coach for Tunisia national basketball team.

Personal life
Kunter is married to Sofia Ayten Kunter Hanımefendi, the daughter of Osman Nami Osmanoğlu, and great-granddaughter of Ottoman sultan Abdul Hamid II. They have one daughter, named Roksan. She acquired French citizenship in September 2010, and since then, he retains two dual citizenship (French and Turkish).

See also
 List of basketball players who have scored 100 points in a single game
 Kunter

References

External links
 Euroleague.net Coach Profile
 French League Coach Profile 
 FIBA Player Profile 1
 FIBA Player Profile 2
 FIBA Europe Player Profile
 Cholet Basket Profile 
 TBLStat.net Player Profile

1956 births
Living people
ASVEL Basket coaches
Basketbol Süper Ligi head coaches
Beşiktaş basketball coaches
Beşiktaş men's basketball players
Cholet Basket coaches
Eczacıbaşı S.K. (men's basketball) players
Darüşşafaka Basketbol coaches
Galatasaray S.K. (men's basketball) coaches
Fenerbahçe men's basketball players
French basketball coaches
French men's basketball players
İstanbul Teknik Üniversitesi B.K. players
Le Mans Sarthe Basket coaches
Basketball players from Istanbul
Shooting guards
Turkey men's national basketball team coaches
Turkish expatriate basketball people in France
Turkish basketball coaches
Turkish men's basketball players